The Levaya Khetta is a river in Yamalo-Nenets Autonomous Okrug of Tyumen Oblast, Russia. It is a left tributary of the Nadym.

References

Rivers of Yamalo-Nenets Autonomous Okrug
Drainage basins of the Kara Sea